Ettore Scola (10 May 1931 – 19 January 2016) was an Italian screenwriter and film director. He received a Golden Globe for Best Foreign Film in 1978 for his film A Special Day and over the course of his film career was nominated for five Academy Awards for Best Foreign Language Film.

Life and career
Scola was born in Trevico, Avellino, Campania. At age 15, he became a ghostwriter.  He entered the film industry as a screenwriter in 1953 and collaborated with director Dino Risi and fellow writer Ruggero Maccari on the screenplay for Risi's feature, Il Sorpasso (1962). He directed his first film, Let's Talk About Women, in 1964. In 1974, Scola enjoyed international success with We All Loved Each Other So Much (C'eravamo tanto amati), a wide fresco of post-World War II Italian life and politics, dedicated to fellow director Vittorio De Sica. The film won the Golden Prize at the 9th Moscow International Film Festival. In 1976, he won the Prix de la mise en scène at the 1976 Cannes Film Festival for Brutti, sporchi e cattivi.

Scola made further successful films, including A Special Day (1977), That Night In Varennes (1982), What Time Is It? (1989) and Captain Fracassa's Journey (1990). He directed close to 40 films in some 40 years.  His film Passione d'amore, adapted from a 19th-century novel, was adapted by Stephen Sondheim and James Lapine into the award-winning musical Passion. He was a member of the jury at the 1988 Cannes Film Festival. . 

In 2009, Scola signed a petition in support of film director Roman Polanski, calling for his release after Polanski was arrested in Switzerland in relation to his 1977 charge for drugging and raping a 13-year-old girl.

Scola died in Rome on 19 January 2016 at the age of 84.

Filmography as director
 Let's Talk About Women (1964)
 Thrilling (1965)
 Hard Time for Princes (1965)
 The Devil in Love (1966)
 Will Our Heroes Be Able to Find Their Friend Who Has Mysteriously Disappeared in Africa? (1968)
 Police Chief Pepe (1969)
 The Pizza Triangle (1970)
 My Name Is Rocco Papaleo (1971)
 The Most Wonderful Evening of My Life (1972)
 Trevico-Turin: Voyage in Fiatnam (1973)
 Festival Unità (1973) - documentary
 We All Loved Each Other So Much (1974)
 Goodnight, Ladies and Gentlemen (1976)
 Down and Dirty (1976)
 A Special Day (1977)
 La terrazza (1980)
 Passion of Love (1981)
 That Night in Varennes (1982)
 Vorrei che volo (1982) - documentary
 Le Bal (1983) 
 Macaroni (1985)
 Imago urbis (1987) - documentary
 The Family (1987) 
 Splendor (1988)
 What Time Is It? (1989)
 Captain Fracassa's Journey (1990)
 Mario, Maria and Mario (1993)
 Romanzo di un giovane povero (1995)
 The Dinner (1998)
 Unfair Competition (2001)
 Un altro mondo è possibile (2001) - documentary
 Lettere dalla Palestina (2002) - documentary
 Gente di Roma (2003)
 How Strange to Be Named Federico (2013) - documentary

Awards
 1966 : Nastro d'Argento Best script Io la conoscevo bene
 1975 : Moscow Film Festival Best film C'eravamo tanto amati
 1976 : Cannes Film Festival Best Director for Brutti, sporchi e cattivi
 1977 : César Award for Best Foreign Film for C'eravamo tanto amati
 1978 : Golden Globe for Best Foreign Film for A Special Day
 1977 : Academy Award nominee for A Special Day
 1978 : Academy Award nominee for Viva Italia!
 1978 : César Award for Best Foreign Film for A Special Day
 1978 : Nastro d'Argento Best script for A Special Day
 1978 : David di Donatello Best Director for A Special Day
 1980 : Cannes Film Festival Best script for La terrazza
 1980 : Nastro d'Argento Best script for La terrazza
 1981 : Nastro d'Argento Best script Passion d'amour
 1983 : David di Donatello Best script for La Nuit de Varennes
 1983 : Academy Award nominee for Le Bal
 1984 : César Award for Best Director for Le Bal
 1984 : Berlin Film Festival :
 Silver Bear for Best Director for Le Bal
 Jury of readers Berliner Morgenpost for Le Bal
 1984 : David di Donatello :
 Best Director Le Bal
 Prix Alitalia for Le Bal
 1986 : Golden Medal of the City of Rome at for the 30th anniversary of David di Donatello
 1987 : Academy Award nominee for La famiglia
 1987 : David di Donatello :
 Best Director La famiglia
 Best Script La famiglia
 1987 : Nastro d'Argento :
 Best Director La famiglia
 Best Script La famiglia
 1990 : Berlin Film Festival:
 Golden Bear (nominated)
 1990 : Pietro Bianchi award at Venice Film Festival
 1995 : Award for his career at Flaiano Film Festival
 1997 : a Golden Palm Star on the Palm Springs, California, Walk of Stars was dedicated to him.
 2001 : 23rd Moscow International Film Festival Best Director for Concorrenza sleale
 2001 : Taormina Arte Award at Taormina Film Fest

References

External links

 

1931 births
2016 deaths
People from the Province of Avellino
Italian film directors
Best Director César Award winners
Cannes Film Festival Award for Best Director winners
Silver Bear for Best Director recipients
David di Donatello winners
David di Donatello Career Award winners
Nastro d'Argento winners
Ciak d'oro winners
Italian communists
Cannes Film Festival Award for Best Screenplay winners